Urophycis is a genus of phycid hakes.

Species
There are currently 8 recognized species in this genus:
 Urophycis brasiliensis (Kaup, 1858) (Brazilian codling) 
 Urophycis chuss (Walbaum, 1792) (Red hake)
 Urophycis cirrata (Goode & T. H. Bean, 1896) (Gulf hake)
 Urophycis earllii (T. H. Bean, 1880) (Carolina hake)
 Urophycis floridana (T. H. Bean & Dresel, 1884) (Southern codling)
 Urophycis mystacea A. Miranda-Ribeiro, 1903
 Urophycis regia (Walbaum, 1792) (Spotted codling)
 Urophycis tenuis (Mitchill, 1814) (White hake)

References

Phycidae